Paul Akkary (born 12 January 1962) is an Australian former rugby league footballer who played in the 1980s.

He played for Newtown for three seasons between 1981–1983, South Sydney for two seasons between 1984–1985, Penrith for two seasons between 1986–1987 and Canterbury-Bankstown for one season in 1989.
He had a nine-year first grade career and played 58 games.

References

External links
Bulldogs profile

1962 births
Living people
Australian rugby league players
Newtown Jets players
South Sydney Rabbitohs players
Penrith Panthers players
Canterbury-Bankstown Bulldogs players
Rugby league players from Sydney